Honey is the third studio album by English singer and songwriter Katy B. It was released on 22 April 2016 by Rinse and Virgin EMI. Is preceded by the singles "Turn the Music Louder (Rumble)" and "Who Am I".

Background 
Katy B released her second studio album, Little Red, on 7 February 2014. The album was supported with the release of lead single, "5 AM", which became Katy's fourth top 20 single on the UK Singles Chart. Katy also scored her third top 5 hit, "Crying for No Reason", which is certified silver for overall sales 200,000 copies. During this time, Katy also embarked on the "Little Red Tour", which started on 25 March 2014 and included 14 dates across UK cities.

Release and promotion 
During an appearance on the Jingle Bell Ball, Katy confirmed the album's title to be Honey, stating later: "I'm a big fan of honey in general, I have jars and jars of it in my house. I'm fascinated by how beautiful it is, it's a real gift. The whole summer I was writing this album I was using all these amazing experiences. Then I knew I had to knuckle down, so I locked myself away in my hive and didn't go out, and the honey is my music."

Katy unveiled first song from the album, a collaboration with Four Tet and Floating Points, "Calm Down", on 11 December 2015. On 5 February 2016 a collaboration with Craig David and Major Lazer, "Who Am I" was released officially as the first official single from the album. Katy and David performed track for the first time on BBC Radio 1 Live Lounge, along with another promo track, "Honey".

As part of the iTunes pre-order, Katy allowed a download of two tracks, "I Wanna Be" and "Lose Your Head", for those who pre-ordered the album.

Singles 
Katy and Tinie Tempah featured on a song recorded by British DJ KDA, "Turn the Music Louder (Rumble)". The song was released as a digital download on 16 October 2015 by Ministry of Sound. On 23 October 2015, the song debuted at number one on the UK Singles Chart, becoming Katy B's first number one single. It is certified Gold in United Kingdom for overall 400,000 copies sold. Katy's solo version is featured on Honey.

The lead single from the album, "Who Am I", was released 5 February 2016 along with radio premiere on BBC Radio 1 the same day. The single debuted at number eighty nine on the UK Singles Chart.

Critical reception 

At Metacritic, Honey holds an average score of 63 out of 100 (indicating "generally favorable reviews") based on 19 reviews from mainstream music critics. Brittany Spanos of Rolling Stone commented that "Katy B has a way to go in separating herself from the influx of R&B singers who dabble in dub, but she’s beginning to pave a path worth following." Brad Nelson of Pitchfork gave the album seven points out of ten and commenting that "new album show her caught up in the flow of something so overwhelming she can't see the beginning or the end of it, time expanding and collapsing with her in its center." Rachel Aroesti of The Guardian gave the album three out of five stars and stated that Honey provides "great vocal melodies elevated by luscious production". Spins Eve Barlow gave the album seven points out of ten, praising Brien vocals and stating that "her vocals dance around the beats as gloriously as ever". Ben Jolley of Mixmag felt that "Honey is an energetic and youthful love letter to Katy B’s clubbing roots." and awarded album eight points out of ten.

Kitty Empire of The Observer described the album as "a paean to clubbing", giving it three stars out of five and criticised that "some tunes are so uneventful you wonder why they bothered." Joe Madden of NME stated that album "suffers when its producers smooth out their rougher edges to accommodate Katy's chart-star status", giving it three stars out of five.

Track listing

Personnel
Credits adapted from Honey album liner notes.

 Katy B – vocals
 Geeneus – engineer, executive producer
 Kaytranada – producer, mixing
 Diplo – producer
 Jr Blender – producer
 Craig David – vocals
 Wilkinson – producer
 Stamina MC – vocals
 JD. Reid – producer
 Sasha Keable – vocals
 Jarrad Hearman – engineer, mixing, mastering
 Stuart Hawkes – mastering
 The HeavyTrackerz – producer
 J Hus – vocals
 D Double E – vocals
 Chris Lorenzo – producer
 Kerli Kõiv – vocals

 Four Tet – producer, mixing
 Floating Points – strings, flute, mixing
 Mr. Mitch – producer
 KDA – producer
 Shadow Child – additional editing
 Jamie Jones – producer
 Kate Simko – producer, strings
 London Electronic Orchestra – harp, violins, cello, upright bass
 Mssing No – producer
 Hannah Wants – producer
 Novelist – vocals
 Lewsi Philip Allen – guitar
 Give Up Art – art direction, design

Charts

References

2016 albums
Katy B albums
Albums produced by Kaytranada